John Roy Stewart  or Stuart or Stiuart  (Gaelic: Iain Ruadh Stiùbhart) (1700–1752)  was a distinguished officer in the Jacobite Army during the rising of 1745 and a war poet in both Gaelic and in English.

He was the son of Donald, a farmer in Strathspey, grandson of John, the last of the Barons of Kincardine. His father gave him a good education and procured him a commission in a Scottish regiment which at that time was serving in Flanders.

In the army of Prince Charles Edward Stuart he was military commander at Gladsmuir, Clifton, Falkirk and Culloden.

Some of his most well-known poems are "Lament for Lady Macintosh" and “The Day of Culloden” ("Latha Chul-Lodair").

References

External links
 About John Roy
  John Roy Stewart
 Biography
 Memorial
 Manuscripts
 Poem

1700 births
1752 deaths
18th-century Scottish Gaelic poets
John Roy
Jacobite military personnel of the Jacobite rising of 1745
Jacobite poets
Royal Scots Greys officers
Scottish exiles
Scottish expatriates in France